The Bacon–Shor code is a Subsystem error correcting code. In a Subsystem code, information is encoded in a subsystem of a Hilbert space. Subsystem codes lend to simplified error correcting procedures unlike codes which encode information in the subspace of a Hilbert space.  This simplicity led to the first demonstration of fault tolerant circuits on a quantum computer.

Given the stabilizer generators of Shor's code: , 4 stabilizers can be removed from this generator by recognizing gauge symmetries in the code to get: . Error correction is now simplified because 4 stabilizers are needed to measure errors instead of 8. A gauge group can be created from the stabilizer generators:. Given that the Bacon–Shor code is defined on a square lattice where the qubits are placed on the vertices; laying the qubits on a grid in a way that corresponds to the gauge group shows how only 2 qubit nearest-neighbor measurements are needed to infer the error syndromes. The simplicity of  deducing the syndromes reduces the overheard for fault tolerant error correction.
    ZZ   ZZ 
  q0---q1--q2
XX|    |   |XX
  |    |   |
  q6--q7--q8
XX|    |   |XX
  |    |   |
  q3--q4--q5
   ZZ   ZZ

See also 
 Five-qubit error correcting code

References 

Quantum computing